The Mayor of Padua is an elected politician who, along with the Padua's City Council, is accountable for the strategic government of Padua in Veneto, Italy.

The current Mayor is Sergio Giordani a centre-left independent, who took office on 28 June 2017.

Overview
According to the Italian Constitution, the Mayor of Padua is member of the City Council.

The Mayor is elected by the population of Padua, who also elect the members of the City Council, controlling the Mayor's policy guidelines and is able to enforce his resignation by a motion of no confidence. The Mayor is entitled to appoint and release the members of his government.

Since 1995 the Mayor is elected directly by Padua's electorate: in all mayoral elections in Italy in cities with a population higher than 15,000 the voters express a direct choice for the mayor or an indirect choice voting for the party of the candidate's coalition. If no candidate receives at least 50% of votes, the top two candidates go to a second round after two weeks. The election of the City Council is based on a direct choice for the candidate with a preference vote: the candidate with the majority of the preferences is elected. The number of the seats for each party is determined proportionally.

Mayors

Republic of Italy (since 1946)
From 1945 to 1995, the Mayor of Padua was elected by the City's Council.

Since 1995, under provisions of new local administration law, the Mayor of Padua is chosen by direct election, originally every four, and since 1999 every five years.

Notes

Timeline

Elections

Mayoral and City Council election, 1995
The election took place on two rounds: the first on 23 April, the second on 7 May 1995.

|- style="background-color:#E9E9E9;text-align:center;"
! colspan="4" rowspan="1" style="text-align:left;" | Parties and coalitions
! colspan="1" | Votes
! colspan="1" | %
! colspan="1" | Seats
|-
| style="background-color:pink" rowspan="5" |
| style="background-color:" |
| style="text-align:left;" | Democratic Party of the Left (Partito Democratico della Sinistra)
| PDS
| 35,562 || 27.12 || 16
|-
| style="background-color:pink" |
| style="text-align:left;" | Italian People's Party (Partito Popolare Italiano)
| PPI
| 12,169 || 9.28 || 5
|-
| style="background-color:yellow" |
| style="text-align:left;" | Pact of Democrats (Patto dei Democratici)
| PD
| 5,184 || 3.95 || 2
|-
| style="background-color:" |
| style="text-align:left;" | Federation of the Greens (Federazione dei Verdi)
| FdV
| 4,023 || 3.07 || 1
|-
| style="background-color:" |
| style="text-align:left;" | Others
| 
| 3,181 || 2.43 || 0
|- style="background-color:pink"
| style="text-align:left;" colspan="4" | Zanonato coalition (Centre-left)
| 60,119 || 45.85 || 24
|-
| style="background-color:lightblue" rowspan="3" |
| style="background-color:" |
| style="text-align:left;" | Forza Italia
| FI
| 31,612 || 24.11 || 8
|-
| style="background-color:" |
| style="text-align:left;" | National Alliance (Alleanza Nazionale)
| AN
| 20,311 || 15.51 || 5
|-
| style="background-color:" |
| style="text-align:left;" | Others
| 
| 4,023 || 3.06 || 0
|- style="background-color:lightblue"
| colspan="4" style="text-align:left;" | Gentile coalition (Centre-right)
|  55,966 || 42.68 || 13
|-
| style="background-color:" |
| style="text-align:left;" colspan="2" | Liga Veneta-Lega Nord
| LV-LN
| 8,875 || 6.70 || 2
|-
| style="background-color:" |
| style="text-align:left;" colspan="2" | Communist Refoundation Party (Rifondazione Comunista)
| PRC
| 5,349 || 4.08 || 1
|-
| style="background-color:" |
| style="text-align:left;" colspan="2" | Others 
| 
|  900 || 0.69 || 0
|-
| colspan="7" style="background-color:#E9E9E9" | 
|- style="font-weight:bold;"
| style="text-align:left;" colspan="4" | Total
| 131,119 || 100.00 || 40
|-
| colspan="7" style="background-color:#E9E9E9" | 
|-
| style="text-align:left;" colspan="4" | Votes cast / turnout 
| 158,406 || 84.82 || style="background-color:#E9E9E9;" |
|-
| style="text-align:left;" colspan="4" | Registered voters
| 186,745 ||  || style="background-color:#E9E9E9;" |
|-
| colspan="7" style="background-color:#E9E9E9" | 
|-
| style="text-align:left;" colspan="7" | Source: Ministry of the Interior
|}

Mayoral and City Council election, 1999
The election took place on two rounds: the first on 13 June, the second on 27 June 1999.

|- style="background-color:#E9E9E9;text-align:center;"
! colspan="4" rowspan="1" style="text-align:left;" | Parties and coalitions
! colspan="1" | Votes
! colspan="1" | %
! colspan="1" | Seats
|-
| style="background-color:lightblue" rowspan="4" |
| style="background-color:" |
| style="text-align:left;" | Forza Italia
| FI
| 21,487 || 19.27 || 12
|-
| style="background-color:skyblue"|
| style="text-align:left;" | Together for Padua (Insieme per Padova)
| IpP
| 12,528 || 11.24 || 6
|-
| style="background-color:" |
| style="text-align:left;" | National Alliance (Alleanza Nazionale)
| AN
| 11,470 || 10.29 || 6
|-
| style="background-color:" |
| style="text-align:left;" | Others
| 
| 7,619 || 6.83 || 0
|- style="background-color:lightblue"
| colspan="4" style="text-align:left;" | Mistrello Destro coalition (Centre-right)
|  53,104 || 47.63 || 24
|-
| style="background-color:pink" rowspan="5" |
| style="background-color:" |
| style="text-align:left;" | Democrats of the Left (Democratici di Sinistra)
| DS
| 35,562 || 27.12 || 16
|-
| style="background-color:pink" |
| style="text-align:left;" | Italian People's Party (Partito Popolare Italiano)
| PPI
| 12,169 || 9.28 || 4
|-
| style="background-color:yellow" |
| style="text-align:left;" | Pact of Democrats (I Democratici)
| Dem
| 8,055 || 7.22 || 2
|-
| style="background-color:" |
| style="text-align:left;" | Federation of the Greens (Federazione dei Verdi)
| FdV
| 2,804 || 2.51 || 1
|-
| style="background-color:" |
| style="text-align:left;" | Communist Refoundation Party (Rifondazione Comunista)
| PRC
| 2,634 || 2.36 || 0
|- style="background-color:pink"
| style="text-align:left;" colspan="4" | Zanonato coalition (Centre-left)
| 47,086 || 42.23 || 15
|-
| style="background-color:" |
| style="text-align:left;" colspan="2" | Liga Veneta-Lega Nord
| LV-LN
| 5,416 || 4.86 || 1
|-
| style="background-color:" |
| style="text-align:left;" colspan="2" | Others 
| 
|  5,889 || 5.28 || 0
|-
| colspan="7" style="background-color:#E9E9E9" | 
|- style="font-weight:bold;"
| style="text-align:left;" colspan="4" | Total
| 111,495 || 100.00 || 40
|-
| colspan="7" style="background-color:#E9E9E9" | 
|-
| style="text-align:left;" colspan="4" | Votes cast / turnout 
| 136,380 || 75.09 || style="background-color:#E9E9E9;" |
|-
| style="text-align:left;" colspan="4" | Registered voters
| 181,623 ||  || style="background-color:#E9E9E9;" |
|-
| colspan="7" style="background-color:#E9E9E9" | 
|-
| style="text-align:left;" colspan="7" | Source: Ministry of the Interior
|}

Mayoral and City Council election, 2004
The election took place on 12–13 June 2004.

|- style="background-color:#E9E9E9;text-align:center;"
! colspan="4" rowspan="1" style="text-align:left;" | Parties and coalitions
! colspan="1" | Votes
! colspan="1" | %
! colspan="1" | Seats
|-
| style="background-color:pink" rowspan="6" |
| style="background-color:" |
| style="text-align:left;" | Democrats of the Left (Democratici di Sinistra)
| DS
| 18,845 || 16.01 || 8
|-
| style="background-color:purple" |
| style="text-align:left;" | Italian Democratic Socialists (Socialisti Democratici Italiani)
| SDI
| 14,981 || 12.72 || 7
|-
| style="background-color:pink" |
| style="text-align:left;" | The Daisy (La Margherita)
| DL
| 13,811 || 11.73 || 6
|-
| style="background-color:" |
| style="text-align:left;" | Federation of the Greens (Federazione dei Verdi)
| FdV
| 4,027 || 3.42 || 1
|-
| style="background-color:" |
| style="text-align:left;" | Communist Refoundation Party (Rifondazione Comunista)
| PRC
| 3,006 || 2.55 || 1
|-
| style="background-color:" |
| style="text-align:left;" | Others 
| 
| 5,456 || 4.64 || 1
|- style="background-color:pink"
| style="text-align:left;" colspan="4" | Zanonato coalition (Centre-left)
| 60,126 || 51.07 || 24
|-
| style="background-color:lightblue" rowspan="4" |
| style="background-color:" |
| style="text-align:left;" | Forza Italia
| FI
| 27,577 || 23.42 || 10
|-
| style="background-color:" |
| style="text-align:left;" | National Alliance (Alleanza Nazionale)
| AN
| 8,472 || 7.20 || 2
|-
| style="background-color:"|
| style="text-align:left;" | Union of the Centre (Unione di Centro)
| UDC 
| 4,068 || 3.46 || 1
|-
| style="background-color:" |
| style="text-align:left;" | Others
| 
| 474 || 0.40 || 0
|- style="background-color:lightblue"
| colspan="4" style="text-align:left;" | Mistrello Destro coalition (Centre-right)
|  40,591 || 34.48 || 13
|-
| style="background-color:orange" |
| style="text-align:left;" colspan="2" | Zanesco List (Lista Zanesco)
| LZ
| 6,024 || 5.12 || 2
|-
| style="background-color:" |
| style="text-align:left;" colspan="2" | Liga Veneta-Lega Nord
| LV-LN
| 5,337 || 4.53 || 1
|-
| style="background-color:" |
| style="text-align:left;" colspan="2" | Others 
| 
|  5,223 || 4.28 || 0
|-
| colspan="7" style="background-color:#E9E9E9" | 
|- style="font-weight:bold;"
| style="text-align:left;" colspan="4" | Total
| 117,740 || 100.00 || 40
|-
| colspan="7" style="background-color:#E9E9E9" | 
|-
| style="text-align:left;" colspan="4" | Votes cast / turnout 
| 135,606 || 78.09 || style="background-color:#E9E9E9;" |
|-
| style="text-align:left;" colspan="4" | Registered voters
| 173,662 ||  || style="background-color:#E9E9E9;" |
|-
| colspan="7" style="background-color:#E9E9E9" | 
|-
| style="text-align:left;" colspan="7" | Source: Ministry of the Interior
|}

Mayoral and City Council election, 2009
The election took place on two rounds: the first on 6–7 June, the second on 21–22 June 2009.

|- style="background-color:#E9E9E9;text-align:center;"
! colspan="4" rowspan="1" style="text-align:left;" | Parties and coalitions
! colspan="1" | Votes
! colspan="1" | %
! colspan="1" | Seats
|-
| style="background-color:pink" rowspan="6" |
| style="background-color:" |
| style="text-align:left;" | Democratic Party (Partito Democratico)
| PD
| 32,297 || 28.44 || 16
|-
| style="background-color:orange" |
| style="text-align:left;" | Italy of Values (Italia dei Valori)
| IdV
| 6,302 || 5.55 || 3
|-
| style="background-color:darkred" |
| style="text-align:left;" | Zanonato List (Lista Zanonato)
| 
| 6,058 || 5.33 || 3
|-
| style="background-color:" |
| style="text-align:left;" | Left for Padua (Sinistra per Padova)
| SpP
| 2,506 || 2.21 || 1
|-
| style="background-color:" |
| style="text-align:left;" | Federation of the Left (Federazione della Sinistra)
| FdS
| 2,494 || 2.20 || 1
|-
| style="background-color:" |
| style="text-align:left;" | Others 
| 
| 1,955 || 1.72 || 0
|- style="background-color:pink"
| style="text-align:left;" colspan="4" | Zanonato coalition (Centre-left)
| 51,612 || 45.45 || 24
|-
| style="background-color:lightblue" rowspan="4" |
| style="background-color:" |
| style="text-align:left;" | The People of Freedom (Il Popolo della Libertà)
| PdL
| 27,048 || 23.82 || 9
|-
| style="background-color:" |
| style="text-align:left;" | Liga Veneta-Lega Nord 
| LV-LN
| 12,523 || 11.03 || 3
|-
| style="background-color:darkblue"|
| style="text-align:left;" | Marin List (Lista Marin)
| 
| 9,786 || 8.62 || 3
|-
| style="background-color:" |
| style="text-align:left;" | Others
| 
| 1,763 || 1.56 || 0
|- style="background-color:lightblue"
| colspan="4" style="text-align:left;" | Marin coalition (Centre-right)
|  51,120 || 45.03 || 15
|-
| style="background-color:" |
| style="text-align:left;" colspan="2" | Union of the Centre (Unione di Centro)
| UDC
| 3,800 || 3.35 || 1
|-
| style="background-color:" |
| style="text-align:left;" colspan="2" | Others 
| 
|  7,029 || 6.21 || 0
|-
| colspan="7" style="background-color:#E9E9E9" | 
|- style="font-weight:bold;"
| style="text-align:left;" colspan="4" | Total
| 113,561 || 100.00 || 40
|-
| colspan="7" style="background-color:#E9E9E9" | 
|-
| style="text-align:left;" colspan="4" | Votes cast / turnout 
| 125,811 || 74.93 || style="background-color:#E9E9E9;" |
|-
| style="text-align:left;" colspan="4" | Registered voters
| 167,905 ||  || style="background-color:#E9E9E9;" |
|-
| colspan="7" style="background-color:#E9E9E9" | 
|-
| style="text-align:left;" colspan="7" | Source: Ministry of the Interior
|}

Mayoral and City Council election, 2014
The election took place on two rounds: the first on 25 May, the second on 9 June 2014.

|- style="background-color:#E9E9E9;text-align:center;"
! colspan="4" rowspan="1" style="text-align:left;" | Parties and coalitions
! colspan="1" | Votes
! colspan="1" | %
! colspan="1" | Seats
|-
| style="background-color:pink" rowspan="3" |
| style="background-color:" |
| style="text-align:left;" | Democratic Party (Partito Democratico)
| PD
| 26,700 || 24.93 || 7
|-
| style="background-color:darkred" |
| style="text-align:left;" | Rossi List (Lista Rossi)
| 
| 6,208 || 5.80 || 1
|-
| style="background-color:" |
| style="text-align:left;" | Others 
| 
| 16,517 || 15.48 || 2
|- style="background-color:pink"
| style="text-align:left;" colspan="4" | Rossi coalition (Centre-left)
| 49,479 || 46.20 || 10
|-
| style="background-color:lightblue" rowspan="5" |
| style="background-color:darkblue"|
| style="text-align:left;" | Bitonci List (Lista Bitonci)
| 
| 17,489 || 16.67 || 10
|-
| style="background-color:" |
| style="text-align:left;" | Forza Italia 
| FI
| 7,967 || 7.44 || 4
|-
| style="background-color:" |
| style="text-align:left;" | Liga Veneta-Lega Nord 
| LV-LN
| 5,237 || 4.89 || 3
|-
| style="background-color:" |
| style="text-align:left;" | Brothers of Italy (Fratelli d'Italia)
| FdI
| 1,431 || 1.34 || 0
|-
| style="background-color:" |
| style="text-align:left;" | Others
| 
| 13,105 || 12.25 || 3
|- style="background-color:lightblue"
| colspan="4" style="text-align:left;" | Bitonci coalition (Centre-right)
|  45,589 || 42.57 || 20
|-
| style="background-color:" |
| style="text-align:left;" colspan="2" | Five Star Movement (Movimento Cinque Stelle)
| M5S
| 9,478 || 8.85 || 2
|-
| style="background-color:" |
| style="text-align:left;" colspan="2" | Others 
| 
|  2,549 || 2.39 || 0
|-
| colspan="7" style="background-color:#E9E9E9" | 
|- style="font-weight:bold;"
| style="text-align:left;" colspan="4" | Total
| 107,095 || 100.00 || 32
|-
| colspan="7" style="background-color:#E9E9E9" | 
|-
| style="text-align:left;" colspan="4" | Votes cast / turnout 
| 114,528|| 70.09 || style="background-color:#E9E9E9;" |
|-
| style="text-align:left;" colspan="4" | Registered voters
| 163,393 ||  || style="background-color:#E9E9E9;" |
|-
| colspan="7" style="background-color:#E9E9E9" | 
|-
| style="text-align:left;" colspan="7" | Source: Ministry of the Interior
|}

Notes

Mayoral and City Council election, 2017
The election took place on two rounds: the first on 11 June, the second on 26 June 2017.

|- style="background-color:#E9E9E9;text-align:center;"
! colspan="4" rowspan="1" style="text-align:left;" | Parties and coalitions
! colspan="1" | Votes
! colspan="1" | %
! colspan="1" | Seats
|-
| style="background-color:pink" rowspan="5" |
| style="background-color:" |
| style="text-align:left;" | Democratic Party (Partito Democratico)
| PD
| 12,028 || 13.49 || 6
|-
| style="background-color:orange" |
| style="text-align:left;" | Civic Coalition (Coalizione Civica)
| CC
| 10,212 || 11.45 || 5
|-
| style="background-color:darkorange" |
| style="text-align:left;" | Lorenzoni List (Lista Lorenzoni)
| 
| 9,329 || 10.46 || 4
|-
| style="background-color:darkred" |
| style="text-align:left;" | Giordani List (Lista Giordani)
| 
| 8,318 || 9.33 || 4
|-
| style="background-color:" |
| style="text-align:left;" | Others 
| 
| 6,583 || 7.39 || 1
|- style="background-color:pink"
| style="text-align:left;" colspan="4" | Giordani coalition (Centre-left)
| 46,470 || 52.11 || 20
|-
| style="background-color:lightblue" rowspan="5" |
| style="background-color:darkblue"|
| style="text-align:left;" | Bitonci List (Lista Bitonci)
| 
| 21,500 || 24.11 || 8
|-
| style="background-color:" |
| style="text-align:left;" | Liga Veneta-Lega Nord 
| LV-LN
| 5,919 || 6.64 || 2
|-
| style="background-color:" |
| style="text-align:left;" | Forza Italia 
| FI
| 3,490 || 3.91 || 1
|-
| style="background-color:" |
| style="text-align:left;" | Brothers of Italy (Fratelli d'Italia)
| FdI
| 1,888 || 2.12 || 0
|-
| style="background-color:" |
| style="text-align:left;" | Others
| 
| 2,688 || 3.01 || 0
|- style="background-color:lightblue"
| colspan="4" style="text-align:left;" | Bitonci coalition (Centre-right)
|  35,485 || 39.79 || 11
|-
| style="background-color:" |
| style="text-align:left;" colspan="2" | Five Star Movement (Movimento Cinque Stelle)
| M5S
| 4,896 || 5.49 || 1
|-
| style="background-color:" |
| style="text-align:left;" colspan="2" | Others 
| 
|  2,333 || 2.61 || 0
|-
| colspan="7" style="background-color:#E9E9E9" | 
|- style="font-weight:bold;"
| style="text-align:left;" colspan="4" | Total
| 89,184 || 100.00 || 32
|-
| colspan="7" style="background-color:#E9E9E9" | 
|-
| style="text-align:left;" colspan="4" | Votes cast / turnout 
| 99,603 || 60.77 || style="background-color:#E9E9E9;" |
|-
| style="text-align:left;" colspan="4" | Registered voters
| 163,890 ||  || style="background-color:#E9E9E9;" |
|-
| colspan="7" style="background-color:#E9E9E9" | 
|-
| style="text-align:left;" colspan="7" | Source: Ministry of the Interior
|}

Notes

Mayoral and City Council election, 2022
The election took place on 12 June 2022.

|- style="background-color:#E9E9E9;text-align:center;"
! colspan="4" rowspan="1" style="text-align:left;" | Parties and coalitions
! colspan="1" | Votes
! colspan="1" | %
! colspan="1" | Seats
|-
| style="background-color:pink" rowspan="4" |
| style="background-color:" |
| style="text-align:left;" | Democratic Party (Partito Democratico)
| PD
| 16,815 || 21.66 || 10
|-
| style="background-color:darkred" |
| style="text-align:left;" | Giordani List (Lista Giordani)
| 
| 13,409 || 17.28 || 7
|-
| style="background-color:orange" |
| style="text-align:left;" | Civic Coalition (Coalizione Civica)
| CC
| 4,612 || 5.94 || 2
|-
| style="background-color:" |
| style="text-align:left;" | Others 
| 
| 10,529 || 13.57 || 2
|- style="background-color:pink"
| style="text-align:left;" colspan="4" | Giordani coalition (Centre-left)
| 45,365 || 58.45 || 21
|-
| style="background-color:lightblue" rowspan="6" |
| style="background-color:" |
| style="text-align:left;" | Brothers of Italy (Fratelli d'Italia)
| FdI
| 6,421 || 8.27 || 4
|-
| style="background-color:magenta" |
| style="text-align:left;" | Peghin List (Lista Peghin)
| LP
| 6,065 || 7.81 || 3
|-
| style="background-color:" |
| style="text-align:left;" | League (Lega)
| L
| 5,704 || 7.35 || 2
|-
| style="background-color:" |
| style="text-align:left;" | Coraggio Italia 
| CI
| 3,392 || 4.37 || 1
|-
| style="background-color:" |
| style="text-align:left;" | Forza Italia 
| FI
| 2,486 || 3.20 || 1
|-
| style="background-color:" |
| style="text-align:left;" | Others
| 
| 1,707 || 2.20 || 0
|- style="background-color:lightblue"
| colspan="4" style="text-align:left;" | Peghin coalition (Centre-right)
|  25,775 || 33.21 || 11
|-
| style="background-color:" |
| style="text-align:left;" colspan="2" | 3V Movement (Movimento 3V)
| 3V
| 1,613 || 2.08 || 0
|-
| style="background-color:" |
| style="text-align:left;" colspan="2" | Others 
| 
|  4,866 || 5.54 || 0
|-
| colspan="7" style="background-color:#E9E9E9" | 
|- style="font-weight:bold;"
| style="text-align:left;" colspan="4" | Total
| 77,619 || 100.00 || 32
|-
| colspan="7" style="background-color:#E9E9E9" | 
|-
| style="text-align:left;" colspan="4" | Votes cast / turnout 
| 83,771 || 50.74 || style="background-color:#E9E9E9;" |
|-
| style="text-align:left;" colspan="4" | Registered voters
| 165,107 ||  || style="background-color:#E9E9E9;" |
|-
| colspan="7" style="background-color:#E9E9E9" | 
|-
| style="text-align:left;" colspan="7" | Source: Ministry of the Interior
|}

References

Padua
 
Politics of Veneto